Super Typhoon Kent, known in the Philippines as Typhoon Gening, was a powerful Category 4-equivalent typhoon that formed in late August during the 1995 Pacific typhoon season.

The twelfth tropical cyclone, fourth typhoon and first super typhoon of the 1995 season, Kent formed on August 24 in the western north Pacific and moved westwards where it reached typhoon status on August 26 east of the Philippines. After making landfall, Kent weakened and dissipated the following day.

A strong and destructive typhoon, Kent left 52 fatalities and $418.9 million (1995 USD, $555 million 2006 USD) in damage in the Philippines, Taiwan and China.

Meteorological history

A tropical wave was detected by the Joint Typhoon Warning Center on August 24. 24 hours later while northwest of Palau, the disturbance intensified to be classified as a tropical depression by the Joint Typhoon Warning Center on August 25. The Japan Meteorological Agency (JMA) also upgraded the disturbance to a tropical depression at 1340 UTC.  and the Philippine Atmospheric, Geophysical and Astronomical Services Administration (PAGASA) named the depression Gening from its list of pacific typhoon names. Moving northwest, the depression continue to organize and forecasters at the Joint Typhoon Warning Center began to issue a tropical cyclone formation alert (TCFA) on the disturbance at 1130 UTC. On August 26, the tropical depression intensified into a tropical storm and was named Kent by the Joint Typhoon Warning Center.

Kent then quickly intensified into a typhoon on August 27 as it drifted slowly west-northwest. The storm also reached a low barometric pressure of 945 millibars. The JMA also assessed they typhoon attaining a 10-min peak of  Continuing west-northwest, the eye of Typhoon Kent passed over the Philippine island of Basco at 0100 UTC, radar imagery showed the storm undergoing an eyewall replacement cycle as it brushed past. Kent also weakened below super typhoon status as it accelerated towards China. After landfall, the Joint Typhoon Warning Center issued its final warning on September 1 as Kent dissipated. The Japan Meteorological Agency also issued its final advisory on Kent.

Preparations
In Hong Kong, forecasters at the Royal Observatory issued a Stand by signal number one on August 30 and advised residents to take shelter as Kent neared the coast. On August 31, the forecasters issued a gale warning (storm signal number eight) as the storm neared closer.

Impact

Philippines
Kent caused moderate damage in Basco amounting to $2 million (1995 USD, $2.6 million 2006 USD). In Itbayat, the typhoon caused $50,000 dollars (1995 USD, $65,500 2006 USD) in damage. In Luzon the typhoon inflicted the most damage as heavy rainfall caused severe flash flooding that forced 65,000 people to evacuate. The heavy rainfall also caused mudslides that flowed down the sides of Mount Pinatubo that buried small villages. The floodwaters and mudslides forced residents onto rooftops where they were rescued. Five people died in Luzon and over 178,000 people were affected by the flooding brought by Typhoon Kent. The Philippine Government provided relief efforts after the storm.

Taiwan 
Kent caused one fatality and caused moderate flood damage.

Hong Kong 
In Hong Kong, the outer rainbands of Kent brought heavy rains and gale-force winds as the storm approached. The RO headquarters reported a barometric pressure of 992 millibars (29.27 inches). The typhoon caused moderate tree damage and heavy rains caused numerous flood and landslides that blocked roads resulting in numerous road accidents that left five people injured.

Southern China
The heavy rainfall brought by Kent caused severe flash flooding across southern China. In Guangdong, flood waters damaged or destroyed 40,000 homes, inundated  of farmland and left 30 people dead. Damage there amounted to 3.2 billion 1995 RMB ($418.9 million 1995 USD, $555.4 million 2006 USD). The typhoon also killed 17 people in Hainan Island.

See also

 Tropical cyclone
 List of notable tropical cyclones

References

External links
JMA General Information of Typhoon Kent (9508) from Digital Typhoon
JMA Best Track Data (Graphics) of Typhoon Kent (9508)
JMA Best Track Data (Text)
JTWC Best Track Data of Super Typhoon 12W (Kent)

1995 Pacific typhoon season
Typhoons in the Philippines
Typhoons in Taiwan
Typhoons in China
Typhoons
1995 disasters in China
1995 disasters in the Philippines